Ogonna Franca Chukwudi (born 14 September 1988) is a Nigerian footballer who plays as a midfielder for Italian club Lazio and the Nigeria women's national team.

Club career
Chukwudi previously played for Umeå IK.

International career
Chukwudi represented Nigeria at the 2011 FIFA Women's World Cup.

References

External links
 
 

1988 births
Living people
Nigerian women's footballers
Nigerian expatriate women's footballers
Nigerian expatriate sportspeople in Sweden
Expatriate women's footballers in Sweden
2011 FIFA Women's World Cup players
Damallsvenskan players
Umeå IK players
Sportspeople from Lagos
KIF Örebro DFF players
Nigeria women's international footballers
2007 FIFA Women's World Cup players
Women's association football midfielders
2019 FIFA Women's World Cup players
Djurgårdens IF Fotboll (women) players
Kristianstads DFF players
ZFK CSKA Moscow players
Madrid CFF players
Primera División (women) players
21st-century Nigerian women